La Conchée is a rocky island  long lying between Pascal Island and Monge Island,  northeast of Cape Mousse, Adélie Coast, Antarctica. It was charted in 1950 by the French Antarctic Expedition and named after the Fort de la Conchée, one of the forts guarding the approaches to Saint-Malo, France.

References

Islands of Adélie Land